The Abaco Slave Revolt was the first slave revolt in the Bahamas. It occurred in 1787 or 1788.

References

History of the Colony of the Bahamas
Slave rebellions in North America
Slavery in the British West Indies
Conflicts in 1787